Mandryk is a surname. Notable people with the surname include:

 Nataliia Mandryk (born 1988), Ukrainian Paralympic wheelchair fencer
 Regan Mandryk (born 1975), American computer science professor